Aberdeen Regional Airport  is a city-owned, public-use airport located two nautical miles (3.7 km) east of the central business district of Aberdeen, a city in Brown County, South Dakota, United States. It is mostly used for general aviation, and is served by Delta Connection.

Airlines and destinations

The airport is one of two commercial airports in the state of South Dakota with airline service to only one destination, the other being Pierre Regional Airport. Rapid City serves 16 destinations & Sioux Falls serves 15 destinations, while Watertown serves two destinations. As of 2022, Delta Connection currently operates mainly CRJ200 aircraft and sometimes CRJ700 and CrJ900 aircraft seasonally. Sun Country also did seasonal charter flights to Arizona. These flights were known as gambling flights, and ended in 2021. FedEx Feeder operated by CSA Air flys occasionally to Sioux Falls.

Passenger Service

Map of destinations 

Cargo Service

Top destinations

Facilities and aircraft
It has two runways: 13/31 is 6,901 by 100 feet (2,103 x 30 m) with a concrete surface; 17/35 is 5,500 by 100 feet (1,676 x 30 m) with an asphalt surface.

For the 12-month period ending December 31, 2017, the airport had 40,152 aircraft operations, an average of 110 per day: 83% general aviation, 4% scheduled commercial, 13% air taxi and <1% military. At that time there were 55 aircraft based at this airport: 34 single-engine, 15 multi-engine, 5 jet and 1 helicopter.

The passenger terminal is one of four terminals in South Dakota that boasts a moving jet bridge, the other three being Sioux Falls Regional Airport, Rapid City Regional Airport, and Pierre Regional Airport. However, Watertown Regional Airport opened its new treminal in August of 2022 and has a new jet bridge which is expected to be placed in service in September, 2022. The loading bridge allows passengers to board the aircraft from directly inside the terminal and right onto the aircraft without having to walk outside. As of September 2022, Delta Connection is the only commercial airline currently operating out of Aberdeen Regional Airport, providing jet only service on daily flights to Minneapolis/St. Paul.

History

In 1923, Aberdeen hosted the first fly-in event in South Dakota. During World War II, the airfield was used by the United States Army Air Forces as a contract glider training airfield owned by Anderson & Brennan Flying Service, beginning on 25 May 1942. The mission of the school was to train glider pilot students in proficiency in operation of gliders in various types of towed and soaring flight, both day and night, and in servicing of gliders in the field. They primarily used C-47 Skytrains and Waco CG-4 Gliders.

From 1950s to 2002 the military pulled out and airline service was boosted at the airport. Airlines such as Northwest, United Express(operated by Great Lakes Airlines), and Republic Airlines were now operated at a small terminal (now a Ground Crew shed) in the middle of the airport. The terminal had a ramp gate meaning passengers would walk up to the plane. In, 2002 United pulled out of Aberdeen, after terminating Great Lakes contract, and Northwest continued to operate now with Saab 340 aircraft until 2011 and replaced by Bombardier CRJ200 under Delta Connection.

In, 2006 a new terminal was built south of the airport. It was much larger, and was equipped with two gates. One had a jetway and the other would be an on-ramp if the jetway had maintenance issues. Delta would eventually replace Northwest after merging with the airline, and Delta Connection would continue flying to Minneapolis.

In 2019, a new larger jetway was added to the airport, which was able to support larger aircraft. In 2020, the town proposed plans to expand the terminal, extend and widen the runway, due to Delta announcing the retirement of their CRJ-200s. In 2021, Aberdeen renewed their contract with Skywest to continue their air service at Aberdeen after Pierre and Watertown replaced Skywest's United operations with Denver Air Connection.

Notable visitors
President George W. Bush landed here in the early 2000s to speak at a rally at Northern State University. Reba McEntire made a stop here on July 22, 2013, when the Phenom 100 jet she was traveling in stopped at the airport to refuel. She was on her way to a concert in Edmonton, Alberta.

See also

 South Dakota World War II Army Airfields
 31st Flying Training Wing (World War II)

References

 Manning, Thomas A. (2005), History of Air Education and Training Command, 1942–2002.  Office of History and Research, Headquarters, AETC, Randolph AFB, Texas 
 Shaw, Frederick J. (2004), Locating Air Force Base Sites, History’s Legacy, Air Force History and Museums Program, United States Air Force, Washington DC.

External links
 Aberdeen Regional Airport at City of Aberdeen website
   at South Dakota DOT Airport Directory
 The WW II Glider Pilots
 
 

1937 establishments in South Dakota
USAAF Glider Training Airfields
USAAF Contract Flying School Airfields
Airports in South Dakota
Buildings and structures in Aberdeen, South Dakota
Airfields of the United States Army Air Forces in South Dakota
Transportation in Brown County, South Dakota
Essential Air Service